Writings and Drawings is a collection of lyrics and personal drawings from Bob Dylan. It was published in 1973 and is currently out-of-print. The book contained Dylan's lyrics from 1962's Bob Dylan to selections from 1971's Greatest Hits, Volume 2. Also included within the book are poems and other writings, including album liner notes. The lyrics and writings are arranged by album era, with unreleased songs grouped with the album of its period. The list price for the new book c. 1973 was $6.95. Later superseded by the 'Lyrics' collection.

See also
Lyrics: 1962–1985
Lyrics: 1962-2001
The Lyrics: Since 1962
Lyrics: 1962-2012

Books by Bob Dylan
1973 books
Alfred A. Knopf books
American poetry collections